The 1979 European Parliament election for the election of the delegation from the Netherlands was held on 7 June 1979. This is the 1st time the elections have been held for the European elections in the Netherlands.

Sources for everything below:

Numbering of the candidates list 
The official order and names of candidate lists:

| colspan="6" | 
|-
! style="background-color:#E9E9E9;text-align:center;vertical-align:top;" colspan=5 | Lists
|-
!style="background-color:#E9E9E9;text-align:center;" colspan="3"|List
!style="background-color:#E9E9E9;| English translation
!style="background-color:#E9E9E9;| List name (Dutch)

|-
| 1
| 
| style="text-align:left;" | list
| style="text-align:left;" | Labour Party/European Socialists
| style="text-align:left;" | Partij van de Arbeid/Europese Socialisten

|-
| 2
| 
| style="text-align:left;" | list
| style="text-align:left;" | CDA European People's Party
| style="text-align:left;" | CDA Europese Volkspartij

|-
| 3
| 
| style="text-align:left;" | list
| style="text-align:left;" | VVD - European Liberal-Democrats
| style="text-align:left;" | VVD - Europese Liberaal-Democraten

|-
| 4
| 
| style="text-align:left;" | list
| style="text-align:left;" colspan="2" | D'66

|-
| 5
| 
| style="text-align:left;" | list
| style="text-align:left;" colspan="2" | S.G.P.

|-
| 6
| 
| style="text-align:left;" | list
| style="text-align:left;" colspan="2" | C.P.N.

|-
| 7
| 
| style="text-align:left;" | list
| style="text-align:left;" colspan="2" | P.P.R.

|-
| 8
| 
| style="text-align:left;" | list
| style="text-align:left;" colspan="2" | G.P.V.

|-
| 9
| 
| style="text-align:left;" | list
| style="text-align:left;" colspan="2" | P.S.P.

|-
| 10
| 
| style="text-align:left;" | list
| style="text-align:left;" | List Leschot
| style="text-align:left;" | Lijst Leschot

|-
|}

Candidate lists

Labour Party/European Socialists 

Below is the candidate list for the Labour Party for the 1979 European Parliament election

Elected members are in bold

CDA European People's Party 

Below is the candidate list for the Christian Democratic Appeal for the 1979 European Parliament election

Elected members are in bold

VVD - European Liberal-Democrats 

Below is the candidate list for the People's Party for Freedom and Democracy for the 1979 European Parliament election

Elected members are in bold

D'66 

Below is the candidate list for the Democrats 66 for the 1979 European Parliament election

Elected members are in bold

S.G.P. 

Below is the candidate list for S.G.P. for the 1979 European Parliament election

C.P.N. 

Below is the candidate list for C.P.N. for the 1979 European Parliament election

P.P.R. 

Below is the candidate list for P.P.R. for the 1979 European Parliament election

G.P.V. 

Below is the candidate list for G.P.V. for the 1979 European Parliament election

P.S.P. 

Below is the candidate list for P.S.P. for the 1979 European Parliament election

List Leschot 
Below is the candidate list for the List Leschot for the 1979 European Parliament election

References 

1979
Netherlands